Deer Pond may refer to:

 Deer Pond (Plymouth, Massachusetts)
 Deer Pond (Stillwater, New York)
 Deer Pond (Wolf Mountain, New York)